Life Art (Traditional Chinese: 寫意人生) is a TVB modern drama series broadcast in March 2007.

Synopsis
Youthful, talented, and handsome IT Software Manager Fong Chi-Chung (Kevin Cheng) by chance becomes acquainted with the talented, intelligent, and elegant writer and illustrator for children’s books, Yam Tsi-Wah (Gigi Lai). He later learns that Tsi-Wah is the beloved daughter of his own calligraphy and painting teacher, Yam Ching-Chuen (Paul Chun). Furthermore, Chi-Chung discovers that father and daughter are distant.

Chi-Chung continues to have ups and downs in fame and fortune. With love as well, he encounters frustration and defeat. Something that is against anyone’s wishes happens to Ching-Chuen, which causes the relationship among Chi-Chung, Tsi-Wah, and Ching-Chuen to make a new progression.

Cast

Viewership ratings

Awards and nominations
40th TVB Anniversary Awards (2007)
 "Best Drama"
 "Best Actor in a Supporting Role" (Makbau Mak - Ko Dai-Wai)

References

External links
TVB.com Life Art - Official Website 
K for TVB.net Life Art - Episodic Synopsis and Screen Captures 
寫意人生~kenny仔令人睇到火

TVB dramas
2007 Hong Kong television series debuts
2007 Hong Kong television series endings